was a Japanese writer from Hokkaido. She won the Akutagawa Prize in 1979, and her work has been adapted for film.

Early life 
Shigekane was born in Hokkaido on March 7, 1927. Her father worked for a mining company. Throughout her childhood she had problems with her hips dislocating, requiring multiple surgeries to address and providing experience that she would later incorporate into her story , about a child with similar problems who has a troubled relationship with her mother. The family later moved to Fukuoka. In 1946 Shigekane was baptized as a Protestant, and the next year she married her husband, with whom she subsequently had three children.

Career 
After raising her children Shigekane started taking writing courses. In 1978 she published her first story in a literary journal, with Sui-i appearing in Bungakukai, and received her first nomination for the Akutagawa Prize, for her story Baby Food. The next year Shigekane was nominated again for the Akutagawa Prize and won, becoming one of only six women to receive the prize in the 1970s. Her story , about a diligent crematorium worker, was chosen over Haruki Murakami's nominated story Hear the Wind Sing, which the committee considered to be too imitative of American literature to be awarded the Akutagawa Prize. Later that year Bungeishunjū published a collection of Shigekune's stories that included the title story Yama ai no keburi, Miesugiru me, and two other stories.

Shigekane wrote several more novels after winning the Akutagawa Prize, including the 1980 novel , about a woman who conforms to the expectations of those around her, and the 1986 novel , about a bank worker whose new bride develops a fatal tumor. In 1985 Toho released a film adaptation of Yama ai no keburi titled Itoshiki hibi yo, starring Rino Katase and Masami Shimojō.

Shigekane died of cancer on August 22, 1993.

Recognition 
 1979: 81st Akutagawa Prize (1979上)

Film and other adaptations 

 , 1985

Works

Selected works in Japanese 
 , Bungeishunjū, 1979, 
 , Bungeishunjū, 1980, 
 , Chuokoron-Shinsha, 1986,

Works in English 
 "The Smoke in the Mountain Valley", trans. John Wilson and Motoko Naruse, Mississippi Review, 2012

References

1927 births
1993 deaths
20th-century Japanese novelists
20th-century Japanese women writers
Japanese women novelists
Writers from Hokkaido
Akutagawa Prize winners